Warren Independent School District is a public school district based in the community of Warren, Texas (USA).

Located in Tyler County, the district extends into a small portion of Hardin County. Other communities in the district include Fred, Village Mills, and  part of Wildwood.

In 2009, the school district was rated "recognized" by the Texas Education Agency.

Schools
Warren High School (Grades 9-12)
Warren Junior High School (Grades 6-8)
Fred Elementary School (Grades PK-5)
Warren Elementary School (Grades PK-5)

References

External links
Warren ISD

School districts in Tyler County, Texas
School districts in Hardin County, Texas